The 2022 P. League+ Finals is the championship series of the P. League+'s (PLG) 2021–22 season and conclusion of the season's playoffs. The series started on June 18 and ended on June 27. The Taipei Fubon Braves won their second consecutive champion after defeating Hsinchu JKO Lioneers in five games. Mike Singletary won his second FMVP in a row.

Background

Hsinchu JKO Lioneers

Taipei Fubon Braves

Road to the Finals

Regular season series
The Lioneers won the regular season series 4–2.

Series summary

Game summaries

Game 1

Game 2

Game 3

Game 4

Game 5

Rosters

Hsinchu JKO Lioneers

Taipei Fubon Braves

Player statistics
<noinclude>
Hsinchu JKO Lioneers

Taipei Fubon Braves

References

F
P. League+ Finals
2022 in Taiwanese sport
P. League+